This is a recap of the 1982 season for the Professional Bowlers Association (PBA) Tour.  It was the tour's 24th season, and consisted of 34 events. Despite turning 44 years old during the season, Earl Anthony continued to roll through PBA opponents, winning another three titles. He topped his own records by winning a fifth PBA National Championship title along with his fifth PBA Player of the Year award. When Anthony won the ARC Alameda Open early in the season, it gave him at least one PBA title for a 13th straight season, topping the old mark of 12 straight seasons with a title set by Don Johnson. At this same tournament, Anthony also became the first player in PBA history to top the $1 million mark in career PBA Tour earnings.

Dave Husted joined a growing list of bowlers who captured their first career PBA title at the BPAA U.S. Open. Mike Durbin was victorious for a second time in the Firestone Tournament of Champions, ten years after he had first won this event. 

Nineteen-year-old Pete Weber, son of 26-time PBA titlist Dick Weber, won two titles in 1982.  This marked the first father-and-son combination ever to both earn titles on the PBA Tour.

Tournament schedule

References

External links
1982 Season Schedule

Professional Bowlers Association seasons
1982 in bowling